Andrei Alexandrovich Raisky (born March 30, 1970) is a retired Kazakhstani ice hockey player, who played for Kazakhstan National Hockey Team. Andrei Raisky is the graduate of Ust-Kamenogorsk ice hockey school. He drafted 156th overall in the round seven of 1992 NHL Entry Draft by Winnipeg Jets, but never signed a contract with them.

External links
 

1970 births
Asian Games gold medalists for Kazakhstan
Asian Games medalists in ice hockey
Barys Nur-Sultan players
Dayton Bombers players
EHC Bülach players
HC CSKA Moscow players
HC Gardena players
HC Milano players
Medalists at the 1996 Asian Winter Games
Metallurg Novokuznetsk players
HC Sibir Novosibirsk players
Ice hockey players at the 1996 Asian Winter Games
Kazakhstani expatriate sportspeople in Canada
Kazakhstani expatriate sportspeople in the United States
Kazakhstani ice hockey centres
Kazzinc-Torpedo players
Living people
Moncton Hawks players
SKA Saint Petersburg players
Soviet ice hockey centres
Sportspeople from Oskemen
Winnipeg Jets (1979–1996) draft picks
Kazakhstani expatriate sportspeople in Switzerland
Kazakhstani expatriate sportspeople in Italy
Kazakhstani expatriate sportspeople in France
Kazakhstani expatriate sportspeople in Denmark
Kazakhstani expatriate sportspeople in Belarus
Kazakhstani expatriate sportspeople in Russia
Expatriate ice hockey players in Switzerland
Expatriate ice hockey players in Italy
Expatriate ice hockey players in France
Expatriate ice hockey players in Denmark
Expatriate ice hockey players in Belarus
Expatriate ice hockey players in Russia
Expatriate ice hockey players in the United States
Kazakhstani expatriate ice hockey people